The 1966 Nebraska gubernatorial election was held on November 8, 1966, and featured former Wausa Mayor Norbert Tiemann, a Republican, defeating Democratic nominee, Lieutenant Governor Philip C. Sorensen. This was the first gubernatorial election in  Nebraska in which the term in office was extended from two to four years, with a limit of two consecutive terms.

Democratic primary

Candidates
Julius W. Burbach, member of the Nebraska Legislature
Henry E. Ley, CEO of State National Bank
Philip C. Sorensen, Lieutenant Governor

Results

Republican primary

Candidates
Bruce Hagemeister
Albert E. Hahn
Henry E. Kuhlmann
Val Peterson, former Governor and U.S. Ambassador to Denmark
Norbert Tiemann, former Mayor of Wausa

Results

General election

Results

References

Gubernatorial
1966
Nebraska
November 1966 events in the United States